Dhulikoppa is a village in Dharwad district of Karnataka, India.

Demographics 
As of the 2011 Census of India there were 164 households in Dhulikoppa and a total population of 787 consisting of 425 males and 362 females. There were 96 children ages 0-6.

References

Villages in Dharwad district